The 2011–12 season is PAOK's 53rd consecutive season in Super League Greece.

They will also compete in the Greek Cup and the UEFA Europa League.

Players

Squad

Last updated: 30 January 2012 
Source: Squad at PAOK FC official website

Transfers

In

Out
{| class="wikitable"
|-
! Date
! Pos.
! Name
! Moving to
! Type
! Transfer window
! Fee
|-
|
| GK
|  Fotis Koutzavasilis
| Panserraikos
| Loan
| Summer
| Free
|-
|
| MF
|  Ergys Kace
| Anagennisi Epanomis
| Loan
| Summer
| Free
|-
| 30 June 2011
| MF
|  Nabil El Zhar
| Liverpool F.C.
| Loan return
| Summer
| Free
|-
| 30 June 2011
| FW
|  Zlatan Muslimovic
| Guizhou Renhe
| End of contract
| Summer
| Free
|-
| 30 June 2011
| FW
|  Lucio Filomeno
| Atlético de Rafaela
| End of contract
| Summer
| Free
|-
| 10 July 2011
| MF
|  Vasilios Koutsianikoulis
| Ergotelis
| Contract termination
| Summer
| Free
|-
| 13 July 2011
| MF
|  Victor Vitolo
| Panathinaikos
| Contract termination
| Summer
| Free
|-
|5 August 2011
|DF
| Vangelis Georgiou
|Anagennisi Epanomi
|Contract termination
|Summer
|Free
|-
|12 August 2011
|FW
| Lazaros Moisiadis
|Apollon Kalamarias
|Loan
|Summer
|Free
|-
|16 August 2011
|DF
| Lefteris Sakellariou
|Kerkyra
|Loan
|Summer
|Free
|-
|29 August 2011
|DF
| Mirko Savini
|
|Contract termination
|Summer
|Free
|-
|31 August 2011
|GK
| Asterios Giakoumis
|Agrotikos Asteras
|Loan
|Summer
|Free
|-
|14 December 2011
|DF
| Leonardo
|Grêmio Barueri
|Contract termination
| Winter
| Free
|-
|21 December 2011
|MF
| Diego Arias
|Cruzeiro
|Contract termination
| Winter
| Free
|-
| 28 December 2011
| MF
|  Juliano Spadacio
| Astra Ploiești
| Contract termination
| Winter
| Free
|-
|2 January 2012
|DF
| Pablo Contreras
|Colo-Colo
|Contract termination
| Winter
| Free
|-
|3 January 2012
|MF
| Vieirinha
|VfL Wolfsburg
|Transfer
| Winter
| €4.5M (33% to Porto)
|-

Technical staff

Kit

|
|
|
|

Pre-season and friendlies

Competitions

Overview

Super League

League table

Results summary

Results by round

Matches

Last updated: 22 April 2012Source: Super League Greece, PAOK FC official website

Play-offs

Results by round

Matches

Last updated:20 May 2012 Source: Super League Greece , PAOK FC official website

Greek Cup

Fourth round

Fifth round

Quarter-finals

Last updated: 25 January 2012Source: epo.gr, PAOK FC official website 
1The match against Ethnikos Asteras was suspended in the 15th minute after an assistant referee was hit by a seat thrown from the stands with the score at 0–0. On 29 December 2011, with a decision by the Hellenic Football Federation the match was awarded to PAOK.

UEFA Europa League

Third qualifying round

Play-off round

Group stage

Round of 32

Statistics

Squad statistics

Note: The Playoffs statistics are included in the Super League column.   Note 1On 21 December 2011, the Cup game against Ethnikos Asteras was suspended in the 15th minute. Only these 15 minutes of the game have been added to the column of "Minutes Played" of the table.

Goals

Last updated: 21 May 2012
Source: Match reports in Competitive matches  0 shown as blank

Assists

Last updated: 21 May 2012
Source: Superleague, Europa League
0 shown as blank

Disciplinary record

Last updated: 21 May 2012 
Source: Match reports in competitive matches, superleaguegreece.net, uefa.com, paokfc.gr 
Only competitive matches 
 = Number of bookings;  = Number of sending offs after a second yellow card;  = Number of sending offs by a direct red card.
0 shown as blank

Overall
{|class="wikitable" style="text-align: center;"
|-
!
!Total
!Home
!Away
|-
|align=left| Games played          || 50 || 26 || 24
|-
|align=left| Games won             || 23 || 14 || 9
|-
|align=left| Games drawn           || 14 || 5 || 9
|-
|align=left| Games lost            || 13 || 7 || 6
|-
|align=left| Biggest win           || 4–0 vs Kerkyra || 3–0 vs Vålerenga3–0 vs AEK3–0 vs Panetolikos ||  4–0 vs Kerkyra
|-
|align=left| Biggest loss          ||  0–3 vs Udinese||  0–3 vs Udinese|| 1–2 vs Ergotelis 1–2 vs Olympiacos  3–4 vs Levadiakos
|-
|align=left| Biggest win (League)  || 4–0 vs Kerkyra || 3–0 vs AEK3–0 vs Panetolikos ||4–0 vs Kerkyra
|-
|align=left| Biggest win (Cup)     || 2–0 vs AEK  || 2–0 vs AEK ||
|-
|align=left| Biggest win (Europe)  || 3–0 vs Vålerenga || 3–0 vs Vålerenga || 3–1 vs Shamrock Rovers
|-
|align=left| Biggest loss (League) || 1–3 vs Panathinaikos || 1–3 vs Panathinaikos || 1–2 vs Ergotelis  1–2 vs Olympiacos 3–4 vs Levadiakos
|-
|align=left| Biggest loss (Cup)    ||1–2 vs Atromitos  || 1–2 vs Atromitos ||
|-
|align=left| Biggest loss (Europe) || 0–3 vs Udinese || 0–3 vs Udinese ||
|-
|align=left| Goals scored          || 69 || 35 || 34
|-
|align=left| Goals conceded        || 45 || 21 || 24
|-
|align=left| Goal difference       || +24 || +14 || +10
|-
|-
|-
|align=left| Yellow cards         || 113 || 54 || 59
|-
|align=left| Red cards            || 6 || 1 || 5
|-
|align=left| Most appearances     ||  Stelios Malezas (48) || colspan=2|–
|-
|align=left| Most minutes played  ||  Stelios Malezas (4373) || colspan=2|–
|-
|align=left| Most goals           ||  Stefanos Athanasiadis (17) || colspan=2|–
|-
|align=left| Most assists         ||  Lino   Costin Lazăr (6)|| colspan=2|–
|-
|align=left| Winning rate         || % || % || %
|-

References

External links
 PAOK FC official website

Paok
PAOK FC seasons